Patriarch Guregh Israelian (6 January 1894 – 28 October 1949) was Armenian Patriarch of Jerusalem serving the Armenian Patriarchate of Jerusalem from 1944 to 1949, succeeding Patriarch Mesrob Nishanian who had served from 1939 to 1944.

He was born Dikran Israelian in New Julfa, Persia. He died in Beirut shortly after an operation.

Upon his death in 1949, the position of Patriarch of Jerusalem remained vacant for more than a decade, i.e. from 1949 to 1957 and from 1958 to 1960, with a very brief period when Tiran Nersoyan was elected as patriarch of Jerusalem (1957–1958), but was never consecrated.

Only in 1960 was a new Armenian Patriarch of Jerusalem officially elected, namely Patriarch Yeghishe Derderian. Earlier since 1949, Derderian was serving as deputy patriarch.

References 

Armenian Patriarchs of Jerusalem
1894 births
1949 deaths
20th-century Oriental Orthodox bishops
People from Isfahan
Persian Armenians